Kenny Solomons (born 29 July 1986)  English actor and model, known for his role as Mason in Brit-flick The Rapture. Solomons lives in Sweden. He owns his own café/barbershop franchise in Sweden, Hammarby Sjöstad, Norra Djurgårdsstaden and Uppsala. The name of the shop is Rusty Rascals.

Early life 
Solomons was born in Orsett, Essex and brought up with his four siblings in Thorpe Bay by his mother and father. He was privately educated at Thorpe Hall and went on to study musical theatre in England, before moving to Los Angeles to take acting workshops and courses from ages 22 to 24.

Career 
Solomons' first professional encounter within the world of film and TV was at the age of two, when he was featured in a Huggies commercial. Solomons has also worked as a model, appearing in shoots for Cosmopolitan and as the face for the charity Everyman. He was an actor in India between 2006–2009, working in the Bollywood film industry on a number of projects. He is currently living in Sweden.

External links 
 https://www.imdb.com/name/nm2891341/
 https://web.archive.org/web/20120402110438/http://www.cosmopolitan.co.uk/men/cosmo-centrefold-hall-of-fame-80279

1986 births
Living people
English male film actors
English male models
People from Orsett